John George White (4 December 1876 – 21 April 1933) was an Australian rules footballer who played with St Kilda in the Victorian Football League (VFL).

References

External links 

1876 births
1933 deaths
Australian rules footballers from Victoria (Australia)
St Kilda Football Club players
South Yarra Football Club players
Australian military personnel of World War I